Aishwarya Rai Bachchan is an Indian actress who has appeared in 47 films in five languages, predominantly in Hindi and Tamil. She made her acting debut in 1997 with  dual role in Mani Ratnam's Tamil political drama film Iruvar, and her Bollywood debut that same year in the romantic comedy Aur Pyaar Ho Gaya opposite Bobby Deol. Rai followed it with a leading role in Jeans (1998), a high-profile Tamil film that was submitted as India's official entry to the Academy Awards. She won the Filmfare Award for Best Actress for her breakthrough role in Sanjay Leela Bhansali's romantic drama Hum Dil De Chuke Sanam and starred as a singer in the musical drama Taal (both 1999).

Rai had six film releases in 2000, including Kandukondain Kandukondain, a Tamil adaptation of Jane Austen's novel Sense and Sensibility, and Aditya Chopra's romantic drama Mohabbatein. In 2002, Rai starred opposite Shah Rukh Khan in Bhansali's period romance Devdas, an adaptation of the novel of the same name. Her performance in the top-grossing production earned her a second Best Actress award at Filmfare. In 2003, Rai played a sexually repressed widow in Rituparno Ghosh's Bengali film Chokher Bali, a sleeper hit. However, the failure of her two Hindi film releases of the yearDil Ka Rishta and Kuch Naa Kaholed to a setback in her Bollywood career. The following year, Rai played a character based on Elizabeth Bennet in a Bollywood-style adaptation of Austen's novel Pride and Prejudice, entitled Bride and Prejudice, a British production directed by Gurinder Chadha. Also in 2004, she reunited with Ghosh to play an unhappily married woman in the drama Raincoat.

In 2006, Rai featured as a thief in the action film Dhoom 2, her biggest commercial success since Devdas. She followed it by playing the leading lady opposite Abhishek Bachchan in Ratnam's drama Guru (2007), a box office hit. Also in 2007, Rai appeared in her first Hollywood productionthe unremarkable The Last Legion. Greater success came to her (now Rai Bachchan) with the role of Jodhaa Bai opposite Hrithik Roshan's Akbar in the historical drama Jodhaa Akbar (2008). Rai Bachchan had five film releases in 2010, including the -grossing Tamil science fiction film Enthiran co-starring Rajinikanth. She also played a quadriplegic's nurse in Bhansali's acclaimed drama Guzaarish. After a sabbatical, Rai Bachchan made her comeback with Jazbaa (2015), a remake of the South Korean film Seven Days, and took on the supporting part of a poetess in Karan Johar's commercially successful romance Ae Dil Hai Mushkil. In 2022, she reunited with Ratnam for the period film Ponniyin Selvan: I, which earned  to rank as her highest-grossing release and one of the highest-grossing Tamil films.

Films

Footnotes
Rai played dual roles in the film.
Rai played a single character who has two different names in the film.

See also
 Awards and nominations received by Aishwarya Rai Bachchan

References

External links

 Aishwarya Rai Bachchan on Bollywood Hungama

Actress filmographies
Indian filmographies